Joseph Aub may refer to:

 Joseph Aub (rabbi) (1804–1880), German-American Reform rabbi
 Joseph Charles Aub (1890–1973), American endocrinologist and educator